Wam Entertainment  is a Lebanon-based pan-Arab recorded music company, production company and artist management company formed in 2007 by Lebanese musician and producer Walid Al Massih.

History
The company, which eventually evolved into Wam, was founded in 2007 as MGN Studios by Walid Al Massih and two partners through a joint venture. At the time, the company was based in a simple home studio that catered to miniature music productions.

In 2008, one of the partners decided to leave the company, and the company was officially renamed as Wam Entertainment. After many other problems with the third partner, Walid Al Massih was left to run the company alone. The company, now run wholly by Walid Al Massih, was expanded to enter the mainstream Middle Eastern market through the creation of the company's first proper hit in Ragheb Alama's hit song "Yighib". Walid Al Massih would go on to use his nightlife connections to produce music for some of the most well known artists in the region, such as Adam, Nawal el Zoghbi, Ayman Zbib, Ziad Borji, Maya Nehme, Myriam Atallah, Adam and Myriam Fares.

In 2009, the company entered the English music market with projects for local Metal band Blaakyum, local Pop artist Belime, and Iraqi international group UTN1. By 2010, the company had created a visible fan base and a powerful financial backing and the company expanded into Video production.

Main divisions
The following are the main operating divisions of New Wave Productions.

Arabic Division
English Division
Music Composition for ads and movies
Events
Clubs and nightclubs management
Artists management
Audio branding

Additional labels under each division are currently operational.

List of artists produced by New Wave Productions
Ragheb Alama
Myriam Fares
Naji Osta
Iman Mansour
Ziad Borji
Ayman Zbib
Lazorde
Nawal Al Zoghbi
Avraam Russo
Adam
Majid Al Remeh
Rayan
Belime
UTN1
Joe Kweik
Myriam Atallah
Cashy
Nadine
Blaakyum
Houmam
Michel Abboud
Bilal Al Rayess
Jean Sakr
Moudy
Ahmad Shoq
CJ Sary
DJ Alan
Jean Mouawad
Melody TV
Melody Radio
Strike FM
Pavos

See also

List of record labels

References

2007 establishments in Lebanon
Record label distributors
Mass media companies established in 2007
Entertainment companies of Lebanon
Companies based in Beirut
Mass media in Beirut